Kartar Singh Sarabha (24 May 1896 — 16 November 1915) was an Indian revolutionary. He was 15-years old when he became a member of Ghadar Party; he then became a leading luminary member and started fighting for the  independence movement. He was one of the most active members of the movement. In November 1915 at Central Jail, Lahore, he was executed for his role in the movement when he was 19 years old.

Early life
Kartar Singh was born into a Grewal Jat Sikh family in Sarabha, a village near Ludhiana in Punjab. His father was Mangal Singh Grewal and his mother was Sahib Kaur. He was very young when his father died and his grandfather brought him up. After receiving his initial education in his village, Singh entered the Malwa Khalsa high school in Ludhiana; he studied there until 8th standard. Then he went to his unver education. He sailed to San Francisco in July 1912. He was supposed to get enrolled in University of Berkeley but the evidence that he did study there varies.  addotya  A historical note by Baba Jwala Singh mentions that when he went to Astoria, Oregon in December 1912, he found Kartar Singh working in a mill factory. Some say that he studied in the Berkeley, but the college did not find any record of enrollment with his name.

His association with Nalanda club of Indian students at Berkeley aroused his patriotic sentiments and he felt agitated about the treatment of immigrants from India, especially manual, worker received in the United States.

Sohan Singh Bhakna, the founder of the Ghadar Party, inspired Singh to campaign against British colonial rule for the sake of an independent country. Sohan Singh Bhakna called Kartar Singh "Baba Gernal". He learnt from Americans how to shoot a gun, and how to make detonating devices. Kartar Singh also took lessons for flying aeroplanes. He frequently spoke with other Indians, many of whom supported colonial rule, on the need for India to become independent from British rule.

Ghadar Party and newspaper 

When the Ghadar party was founded in mid-1913 with Sohan Singh, a Sikh  from Bhakna village in the Amritsar district, as president and Lala Hardyal as secretary, Kartar Singh stopped his university work, moved in with Lala Hardyal and became his helpmate in running the revolutionary newspaper Ghadar (revolt). He undertook the responsibility for printing of the Gurmukhi edition of the paper. He composed patriotic poetry for it and wrote articles.

On 15 July 1913, the Punjabi Indians of California assembled and formed the Ghadar Party (Revolution Party). The aim of the Ghadar Party was to get rid of British rule in India by means of an armed struggle. On 1 November 1913, the Ghadar Party started printing a paper named Ghadar, which was published in Punjabi, Hindi, Urdu, Bengali, Gujarati and Pushto languages. Kartar Singh was quite heavily involved in the publishing of that paper.

This paper was sent to Indians living in all countries throughout the world. Its purpose was to convince both Indians and the Indian diaspora to support the freedom movement.

Within a short time, the Ghadar Party became famous through The Ghadar. It drew Indians from all walks of life.

Revolt in Punjab 

With the start of World War I in 1914, British India became thoroughly engrossed in the Allied war effort. Thinking it to be a good opportunity, the leaders of the Ghadar Party published the "Decision of Declaration of War" against the British in issue of 'The Ghadar' dated 5 August 1914. Thousands of copies of the paper were distributed among army cantonments, villages and cities. Kartar Singh reached Calcutta via Colombo on board SS Salamin in October 1914: he accompanied two other Ghadar leaders, Satyen Sen and Vishnu Ganesh Pingle, along with a large number of Gadhar freedom fighters. With a letter of introduction from Jatin Mukherjee, the Jugantar leader, Singh and Pingle met Rash Behari Bose at Banaras to inform him that 20,000 more Ghadar members were expected very soon.  A large number of leaders of the Ghadar Party were arrested by the government at the ports. In spite of these arrests, a meeting was held by members of the Ghadar Party at Ladhouwal near Ludhiana in which it was decided to commit robberies in the houses of the rich to meet requirements of finance for armed action. Two Ghadris, Waryam Singh and Bhai Ram Rakha, were killed in a bomb blast in one such raid.

After the arrival of Rash Behari Bose at Amritsar on 25 January 1915, it was decided in a meeting on 12 February that the uprising should be started on 21 February. It was planned that after capturing the cantonments of Mian Mir and Ferozepur, mutiny was to be engineered near Ambala and Delhi.

Betrayal 
Kirpal Singh, a police informer in the ranks of the Ghadar Party, had a large number of members arrested on 19 February and informed the government of the planned revolt. The government disarmed the native soldiers and the revolt failed.

After the failure of the revolution, the members who had escaped arrest decided to leave India. Kartar, Harnam Singh Tundilat, Jagat Singh, and others were asked to go to Afghanistan and made a move towards that area. But Kartar's conscience did not permit him to run away when his comrades had been held. On 2 March 1915, he came back with two friends and went over to Chak No. 5 in Sargodha where there was a military stud and started propagating rebellion amongst the army men. Risaldar Ganda Singh had Kartar, Harnam Singh Tundilat, and Jagat Singh arrested from Chak No. 5, Lyallpur district.

Execution 
All of these accused in the Conspiracy Case, for India's freedom who had worked long years and suffered privations and sacrificed everything that man runs after, were executed in the Lahore Central Jail on 17 November 1915. In the Court room, as also standing before the gallows the condemned men refused to accept their endeavour to be termed a 'conspiracy'. They contended that it was an open challenge to the foreigners who charged the patriots, those who were sacrificing everything for the freedom of their Motherland with the offence of sedition, of waging war against the King. Kartar was not at all sorry for what he had done; rather he felt proud for enjoying the privilege of throwing out the challenge at the face of a lot of usurpers. He was really sorry over the outcome of their efforts. He averred that every 'slave' had a right to revolt and it could never be a crime to rise in defence of the primary rights of the sons of the very soil. When he was being tried on the charge of sedition, he took the entire blame upon himself. The Judge was astounded to see such a young boy behaving in such a non-chalant manner. In view of his tender age, he advised the young revolutionary to modify his statement, but the result was the very opposite of what was desired by him. When asked to appeal he retorted, "Why should I? If I had more lives than one, it would have been a great honour to me to sacrifice each of them for my country."

He was later sentenced to death and hanged in 1915. During the period of his detention in Lahore Central Jail, Kartar managed to get hold of some instruments. With their help, he wanted to cut the iron-bars of his window and escape in company with some other revolutionaries. The authorities who learnt about his designs well in time and seized the instruments from underneath an earthen pitcher in his room, But the plan was rendered abortive by the jail authorities. At the time of his execution Kartar was hardly nineteen years old. But such was his courage that in the course of his detention he gained 14 pounds of fresh weight.

Legacy 
Bhagat Singh was inspired by him. "On Bhagat Singh's arrest, a photo of Sarabha was recovered from him. He always carried this photo in his pocket. Very often, Bhagat Singh would show me that photograph and say, 'Dear mother, this is my hero, friend and companion.' "
- Bhagat Singh's mother.

Shaheed Kartar Singh Sarabha, an Indian Punjabi-language biographical film on the revolutionary was released in 1977.

See also 

Udham Singh
Sukhdev
Harnam Singh Saini
Bhagat Singh
Lala Lajpat Rai

References

Further reading

External links
Kartar Singh Sarabha materials in the South Asian American Digital Archive (SAADA)

Hindu–German Conspiracy
Ghadar Party
1896 births
1915 deaths
Revolutionary movement for Indian independence
Indian revolutionaries
Indian Sikhs
People from Ludhiana
University of California, Berkeley alumni
Executed Indian people
People executed by British India by hanging
20th-century executions by British India
Punjabi people